Kevin Chamberlin (born November 25, 1963) is an American actor. He is known for his theatre roles such as Horton in Seussical and Uncle Fester in The Addams Family. For his theatre work, he received three Tony Award and three Drama Desk Award nominations. He also starred as Bertram Winkle in the Disney Channel Original Series sitcom Jessie from 2011 to 2015. From 2018 to 2019, he starred as The Wizard of Oz in Wicked on Broadway.

Personal life

Chamberlin was born in Baltimore, Maryland, and was raised in Moorestown, New Jersey. In elementary school, he starred as Huck Finn in the school's production of Tom Sawyer. After he graduated from Moorestown High School in 1981, Chamberlin studied acting at Rutgers University's Mason Gross School of the Arts in New Brunswick, New Jersey, and graduated with a B.F.A. in acting in 1985.
Chamberlin has since acted on Broadway, having been nominated for three Tony Awards, and has an extensive list of film and television credits. According to Playbill, "Chamberlin moves back and forth in theatre, TV and movies, but 'I kind of get sick of each medium after a while, if I have a bad experience.'"

Chamberlin is gay and married.

Career

Chamberlin has been nominated for Drama Desk and Tony Awards for Dirty Blonde (as Charlie), Seussical (as Horton), and The Addams Family (as Uncle Fester). Additional Broadway theatre credits include My Favorite Year, Triumph of Love, Abe Lincoln in Illinois, Chicago, The Ritz and Wicked.

He appeared in the 1999 film Trick. He also appeared in Die Hard with a Vengeance as an enthusiastic NYPD bomb defusal expert. In Lucky Number Slevin, he again had a supporting role as a New York police officer. Chamberlin's most recent work includes the role of Aron Malsky in the NBC prime-time series Heroes. He also made an appearance in a Law and Order: Special Victims Unit episode titled "Redemption" where he played a man named Roger Berry. He was also a guest on the sitcom Frasier, in season 10 episode 13. Chamberlin previously appeared as Uncle Fester in the musical The Addams Family, a role for which he won a Broadway.com Audience Award for Favorite Performance By a Featured Actor In a Broadway Musical. Brad Oscar replaced him in the role of Uncle Fester on March 8, 2011.
Chamberlin also starred as Dr. Fusion in Teen Beach Movie, a Disney Channel Original Movie starring Ross Lynch, Maia Mitchell, Barry Bostwick, and Steve Valentine which aired July 19, 2013.

In 2019, Chamberlin appeared as Mr. Mushnik in the Pasadena Playhouse production of Little Shop of Horrors alongside George Salazar, Mj Rodriguez, Amber Riley and Matthew Wilkas.

In 2020, Chamberlin was one of the many TikTok users who created an internet meme of a musical version of the 2007 Disney/Pixar film Ratatouille. On December 28, 2020, it was announced that Chamberlin would star as Gusteau in a benefit concert presentation of the musical. The concert streamed exclusively on TodayTix on January 1, 2021.

Filmography

Film

Television

Music videos

Theater

Awards and nominations

References

External links
 
 
 
 Downstage Center interview at the American Theatre Wing, November 2007

1963 births
Male actors from New Jersey
American male film actors
American male stage actors
American male television actors
American tenors
Living people
Male actors from Baltimore
Mason Gross School of the Arts alumni
Moorestown High School alumni
People from Moorestown, New Jersey
20th-century American male actors
21st-century American male actors
American gay actors
LGBT people from Maryland